František Bublan (born 13 January 1951 in Třebíč) is a former Czech dissident, in 2004 named Minister of the Interior for Stanislav Gross's Social Democratic Party government. After Stanislav Gross had been forced to leave the government, Bublan remained in the government of Jiří Paroubek.

He studied at Charles University, faculty of Catholic Theology. He briefly worked as cleric, but after signing Charter 77, he had to work in menial jobs.

References

External links 
 František Bublan, poslanec (Czech Radio) 

1951 births
Living people
Politicians from Třebíč
Interior ministers of the Czech Republic
Czech Roman Catholics
Charter 77 signatories
Czech Social Democratic Party MPs
Czech Social Democratic Party Government ministers
Charles University alumni
Members of the Chamber of Deputies of the Czech Republic (2006–2010)
Members of the Chamber of Deputies of the Czech Republic (2010–2013)